The Tanimbar oriole (Oriolus decipiens) is a species of bird in the family Oriolidae.
It is endemic to the Tanimbar Islands.

Its natural habitats are subtropical or tropical moist lowland forests, subtropical or tropical mangrove forests, and subtropical or tropical moist montane forests. Until 2008, the Tanimbar oriole was classified as a subspecies of the black-eared oriole. Some authorities have not yet recognized this split.

References

Rheindt, F.E., and R.O. Hutchinson. 2007. A photoshot odyssey through the confused avian taxonomy of Seram and Buru (southern Moluccas). BirdingASIA 7: 18–38.

Tanimbar oriole
Tanimbar oriole
Birds of the Tanimbar Islands
Tanimbar oriole
Tanimbar oriole